The 1989 ICI European Open was a professional ranking snooker tournament that took place from January to February 1989 at the Casino de Deauville in Deauville, France.

John Parrott won the tournament, defeating Terry Griffiths 9–8 in the final.


Main draw

References

European Masters (snooker)
European Open
European Open (snooker)
European Open (snooker)
European Open (snooker)